The Sinful Border is a 1951 West German crime film directed by Robert A. Stemmle and starring Dieter Borsche, Inge Egger and Peter Mosbacher. Jan Hendriks won the German Film Award as Best Newcomer. It focuses on the smuggling of coffee, at the time an expensive luxury, into Germany. It is also known by the alternative title of Illegal Border.

It was shot at the Spandau Studios in Berlin. The film's sets were designed by the art directors Mathias Matthies and Ellen Schmidt.

Cast
 Dieter Borsche as Hans Fischer
 Inge Egger as Marianne Mertens
 Peter Mosbacher as Zollkommissar Dietrich
 Jan Hendriks as Jan Krapp
 Julia Fjorsen as Cilly
 Gisela von Collande as Mutter Mertens
 Alice Treff as Mutter Walters
 Ilse Furstenberg
 Eva Bubat
 Maria Secher
 Hendrikje Simonis
 Ernst Schroder as Hugo Mielke
 Adolf Dell as Vater Mertens
 Adalbert Koffler
 Hans Dieter Zeidler
 Arthur Mainzer
 Hans Halden
 Erich Dunskus
 Cornelia Froboess as Bertha
 Wolfgang Jansen as Heinz Mertens

References

Bibliography
 Baer, Hester. Dismantling the Dream Factory: Gender, German Cinema, and the Postwar Quest for a New Film Language. Berghahn Books, 2012.

External links 
 

1951 films
1951 crime films
German crime films
West German films
1950s German-language films
Films directed by Robert A. Stemmle
Social realism in film
German black-and-white films
Films shot at Spandau Studios
1950s German films